Shahapur is an area of Ichalkaranji City, State of Maharashtra, India. It is located in the northern part of the city. Shahapur was in included in Ichalkaranji municipal council in 1985. There are many schools in Shahapur including, Shahapur High School, Vinayak High School and other municipal primary schools. Lord Mhasoba is the deity of Shahapur. An annual fair takes place on the first Tuesday after Gudhi Padwa.

Ichalkaranji